HMS Lark was a 32-gun Richmond-class frigate fifth-rate frigate of the Royal Navy.  She was launched in 1762 and destroyed in Narragansett Bay in 1778, during the American Revolutionary War.

Between 29 May and 18 July, the British captured a number of vessels: the sloops Sally and Fancy, snow Baron D'Ozell,
Olive Branch, sloop Betsey, and schooner Sally.

French Admiral d'Estaing's squadron arrived in Narragansett Bay on 29 July 1778 to support the American army under General George Washington during the battle of Rhode Island. On 30 July, four French ships of the line entered Narrangansett Bay and positioned themselves north of Conanicut Island to support the American and French forces in the battle of Rhode Island. The arrival of the French vessels trapped several British vessels, Lark among them. On 5 August 1778, as Lark lay off Newport, Captain Richard Smith had her set on fire and her cables cut. She then drifted on to shore. The Royal Navy ended up having to destroy ten of their own vessels in all.

The remains of Lark are now part of a site listed on the National Register of Historic Places, the "Wreck Sites of HMS Cerberus and HMS Lark."

Citations and references

Citations

References
 Robert Gardiner, The First Frigates, Conway Maritime Press, London 1992. .

 David Lyon, The Sailing Navy List, Conway Maritime Press, London 1993. .
 Rif Winfield, British Warships in the Age of Sail, 1714 to 1792, Seaforth Publishing, London 2007. .

1762 ships
Ships built on the River Thames
Archaeology of shipwrecks
Shipwrecks of the Rhode Island coast
Maritime incidents in 1778
Fifth-rate frigates of the Royal Navy